This list is of the Places of Scenic Beauty of Japan located within the Prefecture of Yamaguchi.

National Places of Scenic Beauty
As of 17 December 2021, thirteen Places have been designated at a national level.

Prefectural Places of Scenic Beauty
As of 1 May 2021, five Places have been designated at a prefectural level.

Municipal Places of Scenic Beauty
As of 1 May 2021, a further eleven Places have been designated at a municipal level.

Registered Places of Scenic Beauty
As of 1 December 2021, four Monuments have been registered (as opposed to designated) as Places of Scenic Beauty at a national level.

See also
 Cultural Properties of Japan
 List of Historic Sites of Japan (Yamaguchi)
 List of parks and gardens of Yamaguchi Prefecture

References

External links
  Cultural Properties in Yamaguchi Prefecture

Tourist attractions in Yamaguchi Prefecture
Places of Scenic Beauty